The Army of the Border was a Union army during the American Civil War. It was created from units in the Department of Kansas to oppose Sterling Price's Raid in 1864. Samuel R. Curtis was in command of the army throughout its duration.

Major General James G. Blunt, who commanded the District of South Kansas, was placed in command of the army's 1st Division, which was broken up into three brigade of volunteer cavalry regiments and a fourth of Kansas state militia units. Major General George Dietzler commanded the rest of the Kansas state militia units and organized them into the 2nd Division of the army.

Blunt's division fought at the battles of Lexington and Little Blue River before falling back and joining Curtis and the rest of the army at Westport. At the Battle of Westport, Curtis's two divisions were joined by Alfred Pleasonton's cavalry division from the Department of the Missouri, bringing the Union army to about 22,000, including Pleasonton's cavalry. After the battle, the militia units returned to their respective counties while Blunt's volunteers continued the pursuit along with Pleasonton's division. Blunt's division fought Price in the last major battle of the campaign at Newtonia.

Commander
 Major General Samuel R. Curtis  (October 14 – November 8, 1864)

Major battles and campaigns
 Price's Missouri Expedition
 Second Battle of Lexington (only Blunt's 1st Division was involved)
 Battle of Little Blue River (only Blunt's 1st Division was involved)
 Battle of Byram's Ford (only Blunt's 1st Division was involved)
 Battle of Westport (Blunt's division and elements of Dietzler's state militia involved)
 Battle of Mine Creek (only Pleasonton's 2nd Division was involved)
 Second Battle of Newtonia (only Blunt's 1st Division was involved)

Abbreviations used

Military rank 
 MG = Major General
 BG = Brigadier General
 Col = Colonel
 Ltc = Lieutenant Colonel
 Maj = Major
 Cpt = Captain
 Lt = 1st Lieutenant
 2Lt = 2nd Lieutenant

Army of the Border 
MG Samuel Ryan Curtis

Escort:
 2nd Kansas Cavalry (battalion): Maj Henry Hopkins
 Company G, 11th Kansas Cavalry: Cpt C. L. Gove
 Company H, 15th Kansas Cavalry
 Mountain howitzer battery: Lt Edward Gill

Notes
The list shown is the entire Army of the Border.  Brigades from this army fought in battles during Price's Raid.

See also
 Westport Union order of battle
 Mine Creek Union order of battle

References

Eicher, John H., & Eicher, David J., Civil War High Commands, Stanford University Press, 2001, .

Border, Army of the
Kansas in the American Civil War
1864 establishments in the United States